"(Wish I Had A) Heart of Stone" is a song written by Richard Leigh and Wayland Holyfield, and recorded by American country music group Baillie & the Boys.  It was released in July 1989 as the third single from the album Turn the Tide.  The song reached #4 on the Billboard Hot Country Singles & Tracks chart.

Chart performance

Year-end charts

References

1989 singles
Baillie & the Boys songs
Songs written by Richard Leigh (songwriter)
Songs written by Wayland Holyfield
Song recordings produced by Kyle Lehning
RCA Records singles
1988 songs